Clubul Sportiv Municipal Pașcani, commonly known as CSM Pașcani or simply Pașcani,  is a Romanian football club from Pașcani, Iași County, currently playing in the Liga IV, the fourth tier of the Romanian football league system. The club played for twenty-five seasons in the second Romanian football league.

The biggest performance in the club's history was the fourth place in Divizia B, reached in the 1962–63 season and playing the quarter-finals of the 1987–88 Cupa României.

History
CSM Pașcani was founded in 1921 as CFR Pașcani and played in the districts and regional championships. The club played for the first time at national level in the 1934–35 season in the newly formed Divizia B. He had previously changed his name to Unirea CFR Pașcani, renamed again as CFR Pașcani in 1948.

As a club of the Romanian railway company Căile Ferate Române, the club changed its name to Locomotiva Pașcani in the early 1950s. He finished the 1956 season in second place in his Divizia C series behind Recolta Fălticeni, missing the return to Divizia B by one point. This was made up for two years later, winning the 1958–59 Divizia C, after the club went back to its original name CFR Pașcani in 1958. In Divizia B CFR played for ten consecutive seasons, mostly fighting to save from relegation. Best result of the 1960s was the 4th place in the 1962–63 season.

After the relegation from 1968–69 season, CFR returned to Divizia B a year later after winning promotion in the 1969–70 season of Divizia C. As in previous years, the fight against relegation was in the foreground and after eight years, in which the best performance was the 5th place in the 1972–73 and 1975–76 seasons, CFR relegated at the end of the 1977–78 season.

This time it was not possible to return immediately, finishing as runner-up in 1978–79 season behind CS Botoșani, the club remained in the third tier. After two seasons at the mid-table, 6th in 1979–80 and 5th in 1980–81, CFR missed the promotion in the 1981–82 season at goal difference in front of Minerul Gura Humorului. In the next season, Pășcănenii finished 3rd, behind Chimia Fălticeni and Zimbrul Siret. At the end of the following 1983–84 campaign, CFR Pașcani won the Series 1 of Divizia C returned to Second Division after six years of absence.

In Divizia B, the club managed to place several times at the mid-table. The biggest success of that time came in the 1987–88 season of the Romanian Cup. After the victories with Flacăra Moreni 2–2 after extra-time and 3–2 on penalty shoot-out and FC Olt Scornicești 2–1 , CFR advanced to the quarter-finals, but was eliminated by Victoria București 0–2.

CFR Pașcani relegated at the end of the 1989–90 season. After a 3rd place in the 1990–91 season, Pășcănenii won the  Series 1 of Divizia C in the 1991–92 season, but due to the reorganization of the competitive system, in the summer of 1992, dictated by the Romanian Football Federation, the club remained in the Third Division.

The years that followed were changeable. In 2000–01 season CFR was able to leave the relegation battle behind and missed the promotion in front of Petrolul Moinești just as narrow as five years later behind Politehnica Iași II.

In the summer of 2009, the club changed its name to CSM Pașcani and has played continuously in Liga III. In 2012 it was renamed once again, this time as Kosarom Pașcani after the name of the main sponsor. In the summer of 2014 reverted to CSM Pașcani.

Honours
Liga III
Winners (5): 1958–59, 1969–70, 1971–72, 1983–84, 1991–92
Runners-up (7): 1956, 1978–79, 1981–82, 1984–85, 1985–86, 2000–01, 2005–06

League history

References

External links
 Official website
 

Pașcani
Association football clubs established in 1921
Football clubs in Iași County
Liga II clubs
Liga III clubs
Liga IV clubs
1921 establishments in Romania